The Nepal national handball team is the national handball team of Nepal and is controlled by the Nepal Handball Association (NHA).

Tournament History

Asian Championship record
1987 – 11th place

South Asian Games 

 2010 – 4th place

 2016 – 4th place
 2019 – 5th place

References

External links
IHF profile

Handball in Nepal
Men's national handball teams
H